Edward L. Bowen (born c. 1942 in West Virginia) is an American Thoroughbred horse racing historian and author and the president of the Grayson-Jockey Club Research Foundation, an institution involved in funding equine research.

Biography
Bowen grew up in Fort Lauderdale, Florida where he was influenced by a father who liked horses. He rode ponies as a boy and became a fan of thoroughbred racing from watching races on television. In 1960 he attended the University of Florida to study journalism then in 1963 transferred to the University of Kentucky, a move that allowed him to also write for the Lexington-basedThe Blood-Horse magazine.

In 1968 he accepted a job in Canada as editor of The Canadian Horse. In 1970 he returned to work for The Blood-Horse as its managing editor, remaining with magazine for another twenty-three years and rising to be its editor-in-chief.

Edward Bowen is the author of eighteen books, including the two-volume set, Legacies of the Turf , named by ForeWord Reviews magazine as its Sports Book of the Year. He penned the story of Man o' War, the first book in the Thoroughbred Legends series published by Eclipse Press. For the series, he also authored the books on War Admiral, Nashua, and Bold Ruler. Bowen's most recent book is Matriarchs, Volume 2: More Great Mares of Modern Times , released in October 2008.

A resident of Versailles, Kentucky, Edward Bowen has been the recipient of a number of industry awards including the 1972 Eclipse Award for Outstanding Magazine Writing.

Bibliography
 From Foal to Champion (photographs by Dell Hancock)  (1991)
 Jockey Club's Illustrated History of Thoroughbred Racing in America (1994)
 Matriarchs : Great Mares of the 20th Century (foreword by Seth Hancock) (1999)
 Dynasties : Great Thoroughbred Stallions (foreword by William S. Farish) (2000)
 At the Wire : Horse Racing's Greatest Moments (2001)
 Legacies of the Turf : A Century of Great Thoroughbred Breeders (2003)
 Belmont Park : A Century of Champions (original paintings by Richard Stone Reeves) (2005)
 Masters of the Turf : Ten Trainers Who Dominated Horse Racing's Golden Age (2007)

References
 Edward L. Bowen at Radio-TV Interview Report Online
 Edward L. Bowen Book Review by About, Inc., a part of The New York Times Company

1942 births
Living people
Horse racing in the United States
American magazine editors
American sportswriters
American non-fiction writers
Eclipse Award winners
Writers from West Virginia
University of Florida alumni
History of horse racing